Two referendums were held together in Ireland on 5 July 1979, each on a proposed amendment of the Irish constitution. Both proposals were approved by voters.

Sixth Amendment

The Sixth Amendment to the constitution provided that orders made by the Adoption Board could not be declared unconstitutional because they were not made by a court.

Seventh Amendment

The Seventh Amendment to the constitution allowed the state to determine by law which institutions of higher education would be entitled to elect members of the Senate.

See also
Constitutional amendment
Politics of the Republic of Ireland
History of the Republic of Ireland
Amendments to the Constitution of Ireland

References

Constitutional referendums
Constitutional referendums
Irish constitutional referendums
Ireland 1979
Irish constitutional referendums
Constitutional referendums, 1979